Hopea paucinervis is a species of plant in the family Dipterocarpaceae. It is endemic to Sumatra.

References

paucinervis
Endemic flora of Sumatra
Trees of Sumatra
Data deficient plants
Taxonomy articles created by Polbot